Heinz Geese (6 April 1930 in Bonn – 23 April 2008), also Heinz Gieese) was a German composer, pianist, conductor and arranger.

Geese was also composer of musicals and performed as a pianist.

Geese died in Bonn at age 78.

Work

Compositions 
Foxy rettet Amerika, a musical for children from 8 - 80 by Fritz Graßhoff, Schott Music 1977
Die Seefahrt nach Rio, scenic cantata with verses by James Krüss, Schott Music
 Bolero Smeralda. Für Gitarre solo und Zupforchester. Zimmermann, Frankfurt 1988

Recordings 
Fernsehwunschkonzert with René Kollo, Deutsche Austrophon, 2006
Fernsehwunschkonzert with Ingeborg Hallstein, Deutsche Austrophon, 2005  
Freunde, das Leben ist lebenswert, music by Franz Lehár, TIM The International Music Company, Vertrieb, 2003

Book 
 With : . Die phantastischen Abenteuer auf einem fremden Planeten. With a greeting from Mildred Scheel, for the benefit of the German Cancer Aid; Ariola-Eurodisc Society, Munich [1974]

References

External link 
 
 

20th-century classical composers
German conductors (music)
1930 births
2008 deaths
Musicians from Bonn